Mikhail Yuryevich Radchenko (born 5 August 1996) is a Russian footballer who plays as a defender.

Career
Before the second half of 2014/15, Radchenko signed for Romagna Centro in the Italian fourth division from the youth academy of Italian Serie A side Bologna.

In 2018, he started playing college soccer in the United States.

Before the 2020 season, he signed for Belarusian First League club Naftan.

In 2020, Radchenko signed for TSK-Tavriya in Crimea.

References

External links
 
 
 Profile at tuttocampo.it

1996 births
Living people
Russian people of Ukrainian descent
Russian footballers
Footballers from Moscow
Association football defenders
Russian expatriate footballers
Expatriate soccer players in the United States
Expatriate footballers in Italy
Expatriate footballers in Belarus
Expatriate footballers in Georgia (country)
Russian expatriate sportspeople in Belarus
Russian expatriate sportspeople in the United States
Serie D players
Belarusian First League players
Crimean Premier League players
A.C. Bellaria Igea Marina players
Cesena F.C. players
FC Naftan Novopolotsk players
FC TSK Simferopol players
FC Torpedo Kutaisi players
FC Zugdidi players
FC Dynamo Stavropol players